The following list sorts countries by the number of passengers transported by airlines that are registered in the respective country according to data from the World Bank.

References 

Aviation-related lists
Passengers